Criminal is a creator-owned comic book series written by Ed Brubaker and illustrated by Sean Phillips. It was originally published by Marvel Comics' Icon imprint and later by Image Comics.

The series is a meditation on the clichés of the crime genre while remaining realistic and believable.

Publication history
The first series began in October 2006, and ran for ten issues, which were published as two trade paperback editions, Coward (issues #1-5) and Lawless (issues #6-10), in 2007. In Coward, pickpocket Leo Patterson gets involved in an armored car heist that is not what it seems. In Lawless, AWOL soldier Tracy Lawless infiltrates his brother Ricky's former gang to find out who murdered Ricky. A second series began in February 2008, and ran for seven issues. The first three issues, overlapping stories from the points of view of three characters involved in organized crime in the 1970s, were collected as The Dead and the Dying (issues #1-3, 2008). Issues #4-7 were collected as Bad Night (issues #4-7, 2009). A third series ran for five issues in 2009-2010, and was collected as The Sinners (2010). A fourth series followed in 2011, which ran for four issues, and was collected as The Last of the Innocent (2011).

In 2009, Coward, Lawless and The Dead and the Dying were reprinted as a 432-page "Deluxe Edition" hardcover. Included in this edition are a number of extras, including three of the original backpages "essays" with all 13 original accompanying pieces of art, the Comic Book Legal Defense Fund short story No One Rides For Free, the original Coward "trailer" announcing the series, a covers gallery, and a number of pages describing the "process" of making the book. A second hardcover collecting Bad Night, The Sinners, and Last of the Innocent was published in October 2012.

The six trade paperback editions were republished by Image Comics in 2014. Two one-shot issues of new material, Criminal Special Edition (February 2015) and Criminal 10th Anniversary Special (April 2016), followed, and were collected as Wrong Time, Wrong Place in September 2016.

In 2017, Ed Brubaker and Sean Phillips released , a hardcover standalone book. While the author notes that the volume is not officially book 8 of Criminal, it does feature a minor character from an earlier volume, now in a central role.

Brubaker and Phillips, along with Jacob Phillips as colorist, returned to Criminal with a new series published by Image in January 2019. The first issue's story takes place in 1988 and focuses on Teeg Lawless. At the end of the story, Brubaker notes that part of the impetus for the new series is to tell stories of various lengths (from single issues to serialized) with jumps in time. Brubaker writes that he "doesn't want you to know where you're going. Just that it's probably to the wrong side of town". Twelve issues were published between January 2019 and January 2020, with two issues collected in an expanded format as the novella Bad Weekend in July 2019. Nine of the remaining 10 issues were collected in 2020 in a deluxe hardcover titled Cruel Summer.

Plot 

The series' story arcs are self-contained and focus on different characters, but these central characters inhabit the same world, grew up in fictional Center City, frequent the same bar, and share a common history of two generations of crime. With his partner Ivan, Tommy Patterson ran the city's most proficient crew of pickpockets and taught the trade to his eight-year-old son, Leo. When Tommy was arrested and imprisoned for the murder of Teeg Lawless, Ivan took care of Leo and explained to him how following certain rules can keep a criminal "out in the world", out of both prison and the morgue.

Around the same time, Teeg Lawless' two sons were arrested. While his fifteen-year-old brother Ricky was sent to a juvenile work camp, Tracy Lawless was given the option of going to prison or enlisting in the armed forces. Tracy joined the U.S. Army, abandoning Ricky but honing his skills as a soldier.

Characters
 Leo Patterson: A criminal prodigy and childhood friend to Ricky Lawless. Capable of envisioning many angles to commit any heist given a small period of time. Despite his perceived cowardice, he has a deadly streak. 
 Tommy Patterson: Part of the best pick-pocketing crew with his friend Ivan. He was convicted and imprisoned for the murder of Teeg Lawless, which was actually committed by his son Leo.
 Tracy Lawless: A veteran soldier, Tracy abandoned his unit and returned to Center City to investigate the circumstances of his brother Rick's murder.
 Teeg Lawless: A Vietnam war veteran who unknowingly stole from Sebastian Hyde and eventually ended up working for him as an enforcer. His son Tracy would be the same many years later. He was killed by Leo Patterson.
 Ricky Lawless: Brother of Tracy and son of Teeg. An impulsive and struggling teen who grows up to follow his father into a life of crime.
 Jacob Kurtz: An expert forger and author of popular newspaper strip 'Frank Kafka, Private Eye', he's an acquaintance of Tracy and was once married to Sebastian Hyde's niece.
 Sebastian Hyde: The city's kingpin of crime. Most characters in the series have had some kind of dealings with him. He is killed in the final issue of The Sinners miniseries by two young boys who were sent by Tracy Lawless, who was upset that Hyde had brutally beaten his wife after discovering her affair with Lawless.
 Jake 'Gnarly' Brown: Owner and manager of the Undertown bar (known as "The Undertow" due to the "n" part of the neon sign having long been damaged and never repaired). His father Clevon was instrumental in helping Walter Hyde (Sebastian's father) take over the reins of organized crime in Center City, and as such he lived at the Hyde estate and grew up with Sebastian as his best friend.

Collected editions
The series has been collected into a series of trade paperbacks and deluxe hardbacks.

Reception
In 2007, the series won the Eisner Award for Best New Series. Criminal: The Last of the Innocent won the 2012 Eisner Award for Best Limited Series. My Heroes Have Always Been Junkies won the 2019 Eisner Award for Best Graphic Album - New.

TV adaptation 
In February 2023, it was announced that Amazon Studios was beginning development on a TV series based on Criminal, with Brubaker serving as showrunner, writer, and executive producer.

References

2006 comics debuts
Eisner Award winners for Best New Series
Icon Comics titles
Image Comics titles
Comics by Ed Brubaker
Neo-noir comics